Scapegoat Mountain is a summit in the Scapegoat Wilderness of Lewis and Clark County, Montana, in the United States. Scapegoat is the highest mountain on the Continental Divide within the Bob Marshall Wilderness Complex. Scapegoat is the highest peak in the 239,000-acre Scapegoat Wilderness.

The source of the Dearborn River is near Scapegoat Mountain.

References

Mountains of Lewis and Clark County, Montana
Mountains of Montana